The Margarita gas field is a natural gas field located in the Gran Chaco Province of Bolivia. It was discovered in 1998 and developed by Repsol S.A. It began production in 2004 and produces natural gas and condensates. The total proven reserves of the Margarita gas field are around 13 trillion cubic feet (371 km³), and production is slated to be around 210 million cubic feet/day (6×105m³).

References

Natural gas fields in Bolivia